Matthew Jared Rhoden (born August 27, 1999) is an American professional basketball player for the Detroit Pistons of the National Basketball Association (NBA), on a two-way contract with the Motor City Cruise of the NBA G League. He played college basketball for the Seton Hall Pirates of the Big East Conference.

High school career
Rhoden played basketball for Baldwin Senior High School in Baldwin, New York. As a junior, he averaged 19.5 points and 6.7 rebounds per game. Rhoden led his team to the Long Island AA championship and was named Nassau County Player of the Year. He reclassified to the 2018 class and transferred to Our Saviour Lutheran School in The Bronx. As a senior, Rhoden averaged 29.3 points, seven rebounds and three assists per game, earning All-USA Today New York First Team honors. He competed for the New York Lightning on the Amateur Athletic Union circuit.
He committed to playing college basketball for Seton Hall over offers from Saint Louis, Wichita State and Penn State.

College career
Rhoden underwent shoulder surgery before his freshman season at Seton Hall. As a freshman, he averaged 3.4 points and 2.6 rebounds per game. He averaged 9.1 points and 6.4 rebounds per game in his sophomore season as a part-time starter. On December 23, 2020, Rhoden posted a season-high 26 points, 12 rebounds and four assists in a 78–67 win against Georgetown. As a junior, he averaged 14.9 points, 6.7 rebounds, 1.9 assists and 1.2 steals per game. Rhoden was named to the Big East All-Tournament Team after averaging 20.5 points and 10.5 rebounds in two games during the 2021 Big East tournament. On November 22, 2021, he scored a career-high 29 points in a 79-76 loss to Ohio State. Rhoden was named to the First Team All-Big East as a senior.

Professional career

College Park Skyhawks (2022)
On August 3, 2022, Rhoden signed an Exhibit 10 contract with the Portland Trail Blazers. He was waived prior to the start of the season. On November 4, 2022, Rhoden was named to the opening night roster for the College Park Skyhawks.

Detroit Pistons (2022–present)
On December 26, 2022, Rhoden signed a two-way contract with the Detroit Pistons, splitting time with their NBA G League affiliate, the Motor City Cruise.

Career statistics

College

|-
| style="text-align:left;"| 2018–19
| style="text-align:left;"| Seton Hall
| 34 || 0 || 12.8 || .342 || .246 || .568 || 2.6 || .4 || .5 || .3 || 3.4
|-
| style="text-align:left;"| 2019–20
| style="text-align:left;"| Seton Hall
| 30 || 15 || 25.7 || .441 || .337 || .623 || 6.4 || 1.1 || 1.2 || .3 || 9.1
|-
| style="text-align:left;"| 2020–21
| style="text-align:left;"| Seton Hall
| 27 || 27 || 34.6 || .429 || .303 || .833 || 6.7 || 1.9 || 1.2 || .4 || 14.9
|-
| style="text-align:left;"| 2021–22
| style="text-align:left;"| Seton Hall
| 31 || 30 || 33.1 || .390 || .336 || .803 || 6.7 || 1.2 || 1.2 || .6 || 15.5
|- class="sortbottom"
| style="text-align:center;" colspan="2"| Career
| 122 || 72 || 26.0 || .407 || .312 || .754 || 5.5 || 1.1 || 1.0 || .4 || 10.4

References

External links
Seton Hall Pirates bio

1999 births
Living people
American men's basketball players
Basketball players from New York (state)
College Park Skyhawks players
Detroit Pistons players
Motor City Cruise players
People from Baldwin, Nassau County, New York
Seton Hall Pirates men's basketball players
Shooting guards
Small forwards
Undrafted National Basketball Association players